Khalid Mehmood Rashid is a Pakistani citizen who was arrested on 31 October 2005 in South Africa. It has been alleged that he was subjected to extraordinary rendition out of South Africa.

The South African government stated that Rashid had been deported to Pakistan, and that the Pakistani government had confirmed his arrival there. Rashid's lawyer said that Rashid had been a member of the Taliban on the Pakistan-Afghanistan border. The lawyer thought that Rashid was being questioned about al-Qaida locations, and suggested that he may have been handed over to agents of the American government. In 2006 the advocacy organisation Cage Prisoners claimed that Rashid was being held in United States detention at Guantanamo Bay in Cuba. In 2007 the human rights group Amnesty International said that Rashid was in secret detention in Pakistan.

References

Living people
Year of birth missing (living people)